Sim Jae-Myung  (born 7 June 1989) is a South Korean footballer who plays as forward.

Club career
Sim attended Pungsaeng High School (Seongnam U-18 Team). He started his professional career with the Seongnam Ilhwa Chunma. Sim made his debut in a 1–1 away draw over Pohang Steelers on 5 March 2011.

References

External links 

1989 births
Living people
Association football forwards
South Korean footballers
Seongnam FC players
K League 1 players